Napoleon is a city in and the county seat of Henry County, Ohio, United States, along the Maumee River 44 miles southwest of Toledo. As of the 2010 census, the city had a total population of 8,749.

History

The area around the town was once known as "the Great Black Swamp". This area was opened to European settlement following the Battle of Fallen Timbers in 1794, which took place about 26 miles to the east.
The City of Napoleon was founded in 1832 and named for French emperor Napoleon Bonaparte. The Miami and Erie Canal was finished in 1843, bringing German immigrants to the area. By the 1880s, the town had more than 3,000 residents; the population growth due in part to the town's location on the Miami and Erie Canal and two separate railroad lines. At the time, most employment existed through businesses which made products for farmers in the surrounding countryside.

Four buildings in Napoleon are listed on the National Register of Historic Places: the county courthouse, the sheriff's house and jail, First Presbyterian Church, and St. Augustine's Catholic Church.

Geography
Napoleon is located at  (41.392028, -84.126648).

Demographics

2010 census
As of the census of 2010, there were 8,749 people, 3,640 households, and 2,325 families residing in the city. The racial makeup of the city was 93.7% White, 0.9% African American, 0.4% Native American, 0.4% Asian, 2.9% from other races, and 1.7% from two or more races. Hispanic or Latino of any race were 8.0% of the population.

There were 3,640 households, of which 30.6% had children under the age of 18 living with them, 46.3% were married couples living together, 12.5% had a female householder with no husband present, 5.1% had a male householder with no wife present, and 36.1% were non-families. 30.6% of all households were made up of individuals, and 14.5% had someone living alone who was 65 years of age or older. The average household size was 2.36 and the average family size was 2.90.

The median age in the city was 39.2 years. 23.7% of residents were under the age of 18; 8.7% were between the ages of 18 and 24; 24.5% were from 25 to 44; 25.6% were from 45 to 64; and 17.7% were 65 years of age or older. The gender makeup of the city was 47.3% male and 52.7% female.

2000 census
As of the census of 2000, there were 9,318 people, 3,813 households, and 2,470 families residing in the city. The population density was 1,668.1 people per square mile (643.6/km2). There were 4,066 housing units at an average density of 727.9 per square mile (280.8/km2). The racial makeup of the city was 93.63% White, 0.84% African American, 0.34% Native American, 0.61% Asian, 3.52% from other races, and 1.06% from two or more races. Hispanic or Latino of any race were 6.34% of the population.

There were 3,813 households, out of which 32.5% had children under the age of 18 living with them, 50.0% were married couples living together, 10.9% had a female householder with no husband present, and 35.2% were non-families. 30.9% of all households were made up of individuals, and 13.4% had someone living alone who was 65 years of age or older. The average household size was 2.39 and the average family size was 2.99.

In the city, the population was spread out, with 25.9% under the age of 18, 8.9% from 18 to 24, 28.2% from 25 to 44, 20.9% from 45 to 64, and 16.1% who were 65 years of age or older. The median age was 36 years. For every 100 females, there were 89.7 males. For every 100 females age 18 and over, there were 84.8 males.

The median income for a household in the city was $37,467, and the median income for a family was $45,776. Males had a median income of $33,702 versus $23,475 for females. The per capita income for the city was $18,078. About 18.9% of families and 4.1% of the population were below the poverty line, including 16.3% of those under age 18 and 14.1% of those age 99 or over.

Economy
Napoleon's economy is based on the manufacturing of a variety of goods. A major employer is the world's largest Campbell's Soup Company plant, located on the southeastern end of the city; also Tenneco owns one of their largest Elastomer Plants there.

Clear Channel Communications owns the local radio station licensed to Napoleon, WNDH 103.1 FM "The One", which features a classic hits music format.

Education
The Napoleon Area City School District operates one public elementary school (preschool through 6th grade), one public middle school (7th and 8th grades), and one high school, Napoleon High School. Napoleon is also home to St. Paul Lutheran school, St. John Lutheran School, and St. Augustine Catholic school, which provide grades preschool through eighth (8th) grade.

The city has the main branch of the Napoleon Public Library.

Public services

Police department
The Napoleon Police Department serves the City of Napoleon. The department has 23 members: the chief, four Lieutenants, two Detectives, ten Patrol Officers, and five civilian dispatchers and an auxiliary police force. The department operates 24 hours a day, 365 days a year and dispatches the police department, the Napoleon Fire and Rescue services, along with the enhanced 911 system for the city and emergency utility call-outs.

The department has eight patrol vehicles, the primary patrol vehicles being the Ford Explorer, Dodge Charger; and other various vehicles. The Napoleon City Police Department handles about 14,000 calls a year.

References

External links

 City of Napoleon
 City Charter and Codified Ordinances
 City of Napoleon Police Department
 Napoleon Police Officers Association Page

 
Cities in Ohio
Cities in Henry County, Ohio
County seats in Ohio
Populated places established in 1834
1834 establishments in Ohio